Veliki Jasenovac is a village in the municipality of Zaječar, Serbia. According to the 2002 census, the village has a population of 370 people.

Ethnic group:

Bulgarians 2%

Romanians 3%

Serbs 95%

References

Populated places in Zaječar District